The Tarxien phase is one of the eleven phases of Maltese prehistory. It is named for the temple complex discovered near the village of Ħal Tarxien, and now recognised as a World Heritage Site by UNESCO.

The Tarxien phase, from approximately 3150–2500 BCE, follows the Saflieni phase and is the last phase of the Temple period, during which the principal megalithic temples of Malta were built.

References

Neolithic cultures of Europe
Archaeological cultures of Southern Europe
Archaeological cultures in Malta
Pre-Indo-Europeans
Megalithic Temples of Malta
Maltese prehistory